Randall "Ronnie" Rogers (born in Nashville, Tennessee) is an American country music singer and songwriter. In the late 1970s and early 1980s, Rogers charted eight singles on the Billboard country charts, including the top 40 hits "Gonna Take My Angel Out Tonight" and "My Love Belongs to You". He recorded for the Lifesong, Epic and MTM labels.

Rogers has also co-written several singles for the band Alabama, including the number one hits "Dixieland Delight" and "Jukebox in My Mind."

Singles

References

American country singer-songwriters
American male singer-songwriters
Epic Records artists
Living people
MTM Records artists
People from Nashville, Tennessee
Year of birth missing (living people)
Singer-songwriters from Tennessee
Country musicians from Tennessee